The men's singles badminton event at the 2015 Pan American Games will be held from July 11–16 at the Atos Markham Pan Am Centre in Toronto. The defending Pan American Games champion is Kevin Cordón of Guatemala.

The athletes will be drawn into an elimination stage draw. Once a team lost a match, it will be not longer able to compete. Each match will be contested as the best of three games.

Schedule
All times are Central Standard Time (UTC-6).

Seeds

   (semifinals)
   (semifinals)
   (champion)
   (quarterfinals)
  (quarterfinals)
  (third round)
  (second round)
  (quarterfinals)

Results

Finals

Top Half

Section 1

Section 2

Bottom Half

Section 3

Section 4

References

Men's draw with results

Men's Singles